The Trentino Tyrolean Autonomist Union (UATT) was a regionalist Christian-democratic Italian political party based in Trentino which was active from 1982 to 1988.

History
In 1982 the Trentino Tyrolean People's Party broke up: the more conservative wing formed the UATT, while the more centrist wing formed Integral Autonomy. The leader of the conservative faction and thus of the UATT was Franco Tretter. 

In the 1983 provincial election the UATT won 8.2% of the vote, while Enrico Pruner's Integral Autonomy only the 3.1%.

In 1988 the two parties merged into the Trentino Tyrolean Autonomist Party, which gained 9.9% in the subsequent provincial election.

References

Sources
"Autonomists in Trentino", an essay by Franco Panizza
Provincial Council of Trento – Legislatures
Trentino Alto-Adige Region – Elections
Provincial Government of Trento – Elections
Cattaneo Institute – Archive of Election Data
Parties and Elections in Europe – Province of Trento
Ministry of the Interior – Historical Archive of Elections

Political parties in Trentino
Christian democratic parties in Italy
Catholic political parties